The WAC Clearinghouse publishes peer-reviewed, open-access journals and books, as well as other professional resources for teachers and instructional materials for students. Writing-across-the-curriculum (WAC) refers to a formal programmatic approach within contemporary secondary and higher education composition studies that promotes the importance of writing in classes outside of composition.

Working with the Association for Writing Across the Curriculum Programs (AWAC), the WAC Clearinghouse operates as a publishing collaborative, drawing on contributions from more than 180 individuals from six continents serving on the editorial boards of academic journals supported by the Clearinghouse, as editors or reviewers of its book series, as editors of resource pages on its website, and as members of the overall Clearinghouse editorial board. The open-access character of the scholarship available through the Clearinghouse book series provides free access to scholarly monographs, edited collections, and textbooks, providing students and teachers with an alternative to purchasing scholarly and classroom instructional materials. For individuals and libraries who wish to own print copies of its books, the Clearinghouse works with University Press of Colorado to make print books available in low-cost editions. The Clearinghouse also collaborates with other open-access publishers in the field of writing studies, including Computers and Composition Digital Press and Writing Spaces, which both publish  open-access scholarly work, including innovative, multimodal digital writing projects, using traditional academic peer reviewed processes. The WAC Clearinghouse addresses several disciplinary areas within writing studies, such as second-language writing, writing fellows, antiracism, and writing in the STEM disciplines.

History and resources
Established in 1997, the Clearinghouse is among the most successful open-access publishing projects in the humanities.  It publishes six active academic journals, including Across the Disciplines, devoted to language, learning and academic writing; The WAC Journal, focused on WAC theory and ideas; Double Helix, an international journal on writing, critical thinking, pedagogical theory and classroom practice; Journal of Writing Analytics, which focuses on the study of writing processes and written texts through a wide range of analytical tools; Journal of Basic Writing, which publishes articles on theory, research, and teaching practices related to basic writing; and Open Words: Access and English Studies. It also provides access to the archives of eleven journals, including RhetNet, an online journal of rhetoric and composition that explores what "net" publishing may be in its natural form and Language and Learning Across the Disciplines. The Clearinghouse also has published more than 100 original scholarly monographs and collections and has made more than 60 out-of-print books available in open-access digital formats. The Clearinghouse also provides access to peer-reviewed resources for teachers who wish to use writing in courses across the disciplines, including a bibliography (published in collaboration with CompPile, which became part of the Clearinghouse in 2018), resource pages on writing fellows programs and second-language learners, conference proceedings, WAC program descriptions, a list of scholarly journals, and the Statement on WAC Principles and Practices, among others.

On March 14, 2022, the Clearinghouse celebrated the 25th anniversary of its founding. In the previous seven years, its books had been honored with eight book-of-the-year awards from professional organizations in writing studies. Since mid-2001, when it began keeping web stats, more than 27 million PDF and ePub documents had been downloaded, including nearly 3 million in the previous year.

Sustainable Publishing Initiative

In May 2012, to mark its fifteenth year of operation, the WAC Clearinghouse launched the 25 Collective, a demonstration project for sustainable publishing. The goal of the project was to publish 25 new books for a total expenditure of $50,000—a cost far below that borne by traditional academic presses. Leveraging university resources (office space, computing resources, and web servers), the project operated within its budget and had, by March 2017, reached its goal, producing 29 books at an average cost of less than $2,000 per book. The success of the project led to the launch of the Colorado State University Open Press, a publishing project that supported the use of the publishing collaborative model developed through the WAC Clearinghouse in other disciplines. The Open Press went on hiatus in 2021 following changes in university leadership.

Support

The Clearinghouse is hosted by Colorado State University, which provides in-kind support. It also receives support from donations and funds from purchases of selected books in print form. Donations are used to defray costs associated with honoraria for graduate students who serve as copy editors and designers for Clearinghouse books, for web hosting, for the purchase of ISBN numbers and registration of Digital Object Identifiers (DOIs), and for software and equipment expenses. Interested patrons my donate online or by check through the Clearinghouse Web site.

Funding for the Clearinghouse is provided from donations to the Colorado State University Foundation's fund supporting the WAC Clearinghouse as well as from sales of print editions of our open-access scholarly books. In-kind and other forms of support are provided by the Department of English and the Division of Information Technology at Colorado State University, the National Council of Teachers of English, University Press of Colorado, Utah State University Press, and the faculty and staff at Colorado State University's Morgan Library, who provide assistance digitizing republished books and cataloging new publications.

External links
WAC Clearinghouse 
Association for Writing Across the Curriculum Programs (AWAC)
Computers and Composition Digital Press
Writing Spaces Open Textbook Project
2014 Statement on WAC Principles and Practices,
University Press of Colorado

References

Education theory
Open access projects